Anne-Laure Mignerey (née Condevaux; born 16 July 1973) is a French cross-country skier. She competed in two events at the 1998 Winter Olympics.

Cross-country skiing results
All results are sourced from the International Ski Federation (FIS).

Olympic Games

World Championships

World Cup

Season standings

References

External links
 

1973 births
Living people
French female cross-country skiers
Olympic cross-country skiers of France
Cross-country skiers at the 1998 Winter Olympics
Sportspeople from Haute-Savoie
20th-century French women